KUUZ (95.9 FM) is a radio station broadcasting a religious format, as an affiliate of SonLife Radio Network. Licensed to Lake Village, Arkansas, United States, the station is currently owned by Family Worship Center Church, Inc.

References

External links
 
 

Lake Village, Arkansas
UUZ